The American Medical Marijuana Association (AMMA) is an organization formed to promote and protect legal access to medical marijuana.

AMMA was founded in cyberspace on October 27, 2000, by Steve Kubby, Ed Rosenthal, and Tod H. Mikuriya.

AMMA is a group of volunteers working together to implement, preserve and protect medicinal cannabis patients through political activism. AMMA's activism includes aiding in the defense of cannabis patients should they be prosecuted for possessing medical marijuana. One way AMMA is able to do this is through the sharing of motions, writs, declarations, and demands. AMMA also advocates to preserve California Proposition 215, the Compassionate Use Act of 1996.

AMMA National Director
Steve Kubby: Former Libertarian Party nominee for governor of California and author of two books on drug policy.

AMMA Advisors
Richard Cowan: Former National Director of NORML. Member of the Advisory Board of the Drug Policy Foundation. Senior Policy Advisor to NORML. Editor and Publisher, marijuananews.
Ed Rosenthal: He has written and edited more than a dozen books about marijuana cultivation and social policy.
Rev. Lynnette Shaw: Founder and director of the Cannabis Buyers' Club Marin in Fairfax, California, licensed since 1997.

References

External links
VIDEO: Cannabis and Cannabinoids in the 21st Century: Medical Marijuana Dr. David Bearman speaks at the University of Wisconsin School of Medicine and Public Health, November 2007.

Medicinal use of cannabis organizations based in the United States
Medical associations based in the United States
Organizations established in 1999
1999 in cannabis
Medical and health organizations based in California
1999 establishments in the United States